The National Lacrosse League was a box lacrosse league that lasted two seasons: 1974 and 1975.  It is not related to the current National Lacrosse League.

Originally conceived by hockey owners as a means to fill their arenas in the summer months, the league was not very successful, with only Philadelphia and Montreal drawing sizeable crowds.  The league folded in 1976 after the demise of several franchises and the inability of the Montreal franchise to play home games in 1976 because of the Summer Olympics.

Like the current NLL, the majority of the league's players were from Canada.

Besides featuring NHL players such as Rick Dudley (Rochester) and Doug Favell (Philadelphia), the league also included Bruce Arena (Montreal)—who went on to greater fame as the head coach of the United States men's national soccer team.

History
The type of play during this short-early lived era of the NLL was a faster paced game, played more like an NHL style as opposed to the basketball style of the current league. Equipment differences include no face guards and wooden sticks. The 1976 season was cancelled due to three of the six teams going bankrupt and the Montreal team having to go two months without a home game because the 1976 Olympics would be using the Montreal Forum for boxing. After the 1975 season, there would not be another professional lacrosse league in North America until the birth of the Eagle Pro Box Lacrosse League in January 1987.

Teams
 Maryland Arrows (1974-1975) 
 Montreal Quebecois (1974-1975) 
 Philadelphia Wings (1974-1975) 1
 Rochester Griffins (1974)/Long Island Tomahawks (1975) 2 
 Syracuse Stingers (1974)/Quebec Caribous (1975) 
 Toronto Tomahawks (1974) 2/Boston Bolts (1975) 

1The Philadelphia Wings in this league are not related to the modern Philadelphia Wings of the modern National Lacrosse League.
2The 1974 Toronto team and the 1975 Long Island team had the same name (Tomahawks), but they were separate franchises.

Champions

1975 season

Final standings

Playoffs

Top Ten Scorers

See also
 National Lacrosse Association

References

External links
1974–1975 National Lacrosse League film page at Lax-TV.com

Defunct sports leagues in Canada
Sports leagues established in 1974
1976 disestablishments
Lacrosse leagues in the United States
Lacrosse leagues in Canada
Defunct sports leagues in the United States
1974 in Canadian sports
1975 in Canadian sports
1974 in lacrosse
1975 in lacrosse
1974 in American sports
1975 in American sports
Sports leagues in the United States
Professional sports leagues in the United States